One More Saturday Night is a 1986 comedy film written by Al Franken and Tom Davis and directed by Dennis Klein.

Plot
The film is about life on a Saturday night in St. Cloud, Minnesota. Russ Cadwell is ready to have sex with his girlfriend, Diane Lundahl. Doug, a petty thief, decides to become a burglar, and his friend Traci suggests they burglarize a nearby house. Mr. Lundahl, father of Diane, Karen, and Kevin, goes on a date with a woman named Peggy. They have sex in a car at the park.

Karen is babysitting for Bill and Lynn Neal as they go out to eat. Karen's boyfriend comes over to the house and talks her into having a party there. Russ gets into an argument with Diane. She and her friend, Tobi, go to the local bar, drink, and watch Bad Mouth, the band playing there. The lead band members, Larry Hays and Paul Flum, are both hoping to score. Things get crazier but also better as time goes by.

Cast
 Al Franken as Paul Flum
 Tom Davis as Larry Hays
 Moira Harris as Peggy
 Frank Howard as Eddie
 Bess Meyer as Tobi
 David Reynolds as Russ Cadwell
 Chelcie Ross as Mr. Lundahl
 Nan Woods as Diane Lundahl
 Nina Siemaszko as Karen Lundahl
 Jonathan Singer as Kevin Lundahl
 Eric Saiet as Doug
 Meshach Taylor as Bill Neal
 Dianne B. Shaw as Lynn Neal
 Jessica Schwartz as Traci
 Rondi Reed as Mrs. Becker
 Ann Coyle as Night desk clerk
 Steve Pink as Dogman
 John Cameron Mitchell as Drunk Teen

Critical reception
TV Guide says the film "suffers from trying to explore a variety of situations, and ultimately gets nothing said at all. The situations are routine, lacking wit or originality. Director Dennis Klein's pacing is slack and reveals no flare [sic] for comedy."

Trivia
Franken appeared on the 1985-86 season finale of Saturday Night Live during Weekend Update and announced that Columbia Pictures was test-marketing the film in Sacramento, California in June 1986; he also displayed a map depicting the locations of movie theaters showing the film, and provided directions to the nearest theater for viewers in the San Francisco Bay Area.

The movie's title is taken from the Grateful Dead song of the same name. Franken and Davis were big Grateful Dead fans.

Production
Portions of the movie were filmed in Glenview, Illinois and at the Chateau Louise Resort in West Dundee, Illinois.

See also
 List of American films of 1986

References

External links 
 
 

American teen comedy films
American coming-of-age comedy films
1986 films
Columbia Pictures films
1980s teen comedy films
Films set in Minnesota
Films shot in Minnesota
Films with screenplays by Al Franken
Films with screenplays by Tom Davis (comedian)
1986 comedy films
1980s English-language films
1980s American films